The 1926 Penn Quakers football team was an American football team that represented the University of Pennsylvania as an independent during the 1926 college football season. In their fourth season under head coach Lou Young, the Quakers compiled a 7–1–1 record, shut out six of nine opponents, and outscored all opponents by a total of 204 to 20. The team played its home games at Franklin Field in Philadelphia.

Schedule

References

Penn
Penn Quakers football seasons
Penn Quakers football